Turist is a village in the Khachmaz Rayon of Azerbaijan.  The village forms part of the municipality of Nabran.

References

Home Page Nabran
Nabran Resort zone

Populated places in Khachmaz District